Guanxing Highway (Simplified Chinese:关兴高速公路, Traditional Chinese:關興高速公路) connects Guanling County and the city of Xingyi, both within Guizhou Province of China.

Bridge
The highway crosses the Beipan River on the  Beipan River Guanxing Highway Bridge. It was the highest bridge in the world from 2003 to 2005.

See also

References

Roads in China
Transport in Guizhou
Xingyi, Guizhou